A Feather on the Breath of God is an album of sacred vocal music written in the 12th century by the German abbess Hildegard of Bingen, and recorded by British vocal ensemble Gothic Voices with English soprano Emma Kirkby. It was released by the Hyperion Records label in 1982.

Production
It was recorded in St. Jude's Church, Hampstead Garden Suburb, London, on 14 September 1981. The music and Latin texts are from a contemporary medieval manuscript (Wiesbaden, Hessische Landesbibliothek M52) edited by Dr. Christopher Page, who also directed the recorded performance itself.

Notes
It is an album of early medieval plainchant of which the title is taken from a passage in Hildegard's writings in which she describes herself:

Listen: there was once a king sitting on his throne. Around him stood great and wonderfully beautiful columns ornamented with ivory, bearing the banners of the king with great honour. Then it pleased the king to raise a small feather from the ground and he commanded it to fly. The feather flew, not because of anything in itself but because the air bore it along. Thus am I '"A feather on the breath of God."

Accolades
The album received the Early-Medieval Gramophone Award for 1982–1983.

Legacy
In 2020, the album was selected by the Library of Congress for preservation in the National Recording Registry for being "culturally, historically, or aesthetically significant".

The recording of "O Euchari" was sampled on "The Sun Rising" by The Beloved, and "Belfast" by Orbital.

Track listing

All compositions (sequences and hymns) written by Hildegard of Bingen.
“Columba aspexit” (5:18)
“Ave, generosa” (4:36)
“O ignis spiritus” (4:48)
“O Ierusalem” (8:02)
“O Euchari” (5:43)
“O viridissima virga” (3:13)
“O presul vere civitatis” (6:12)
“O Ecclesia” (6:11)

Personnel

Musicians
Emma Kirkby – soprano
Emily Van Evera – soprano
Poppy Holden – soprano
Judith Stell – soprano
Margaret Philpot – contralto
Andrew Parrott – tenor
Kevin Breen – tenor
Howard Milner – tenor
Doreen Muskett – symphony
Robert White – reed drones
Christopher Page – director

Recording and production personnel
Tony Faulkner – recording engineer
Martin Compton – recording producer
Terry Shannon – front design
Edward Perry – executive producer

References

Christian chant albums
Western plainchant
Early music albums
1982 albums
Gramophone Award winners
Hildegard of Bingen
United States National Recording Registry recordings
United States National Recording Registry albums